"Every Day I Love You" is the final single from Irish boy band Boyzone before their initial split in 2000. The song peaked at  3 on the UK Singles Chart and became their eighth No. 1 single in Ireland. The song has received a Silver certification for shipping 200,000 copies in the UK.

Music video
The video shows the band traveling in a car, riding through Prague. A woman is shown staring at them along the way until they reach a café where they stop, and the woman places her suitcase on their car and vanishes. As the song progresses, the band sees other people vanish into thin air as well, but they eventually reappear as the song ends. The woman who places her suitcase on their car appears again and takes her suitcase back, and the band eventually exit from the café in their car.

Track listings
UK CD1
 "Every Day I Love You"
 "No Matter"
 "Will I Ever See You"

UK CD2 (in limited-edition digipak)
 "Every Day I Love You" 
 "A Different Beat" (live from Sheffield Arena 15 May 1999) 
 "Boyzone Christmas Message" (live from the video shoot for "Every Day I Love You" in Prague on 16 October 1999) 

UK cassette single
 "Every Day I Love You"
 "No Matter"

Charts

Weekly charts

Year-end charts

Certifications

References

1999 singles
1999 songs
Boyzone songs
Polydor Records singles
Pop ballads
Song recordings produced by Stephen Lipson
Songs written by Frank J. Myers
Songs written by Gary Baker (songwriter)